Palika Bazaar,  is an underground market located between the inner and outer circle of Connaught Place, Delhi, India. It is named after Palika Bazaar of Mumbai. Palika Bazaar hosts 380 numbered shops selling a diverse range of items; however, the market is dominated by electronic items and clothing. Palika Bazaar was set up in the late 1970s, but since the 1980s it has seen a decline in customers, in part due to the opening of several new, modern shopping malls all over Delhi.

Palika Bazaar is estimated to have some 15,000 people within its confines at any given time and also attracts many foreign tourists. It is known as a place with a very level prices and a famous tourist attraction. It also has a reputation for a wide availability of illegal products such as pornography, stolen goods, fake designer products and unlicensed CDs, software and movies. Police conduct regular raids to recover stolen or counterfeit merchandise, but this has failed to put an end to the illegal activity in the market.

It has been listed as a notorious market since 2009 by the USTR for being an underground market with large amounts of counterfeit products including pirated software and media.

W place

Security Problems 
After the rape of a female shopper by two shopkeepers in April 2007, Delhi Police advised women against entering Palika Bazar alone. Local media reported that female visitors often complain about eveteasing and harassment, and a lack of proper trial rooms.

"Regeneration" Project 
As part of a wider effort, the New Delhi Municipal Council is currently working on plans for a major "regeneration of Palika Bazaar", described to be in a state of decay.

Gates of Palika Bazaar 

 Gate no. 1: Main gate. Faces Connaught Place Central Park, with F Block on the right and Palika Underground Parking on the left. Staircase entry.
 Gate no. 2: Faces Palika Underground Parking. Handicap ramp entry.
 Gate no. 3: Not in use. Faces Palika Underground Parking. Closed to the public.
 Gate no. 4: Spiral staircase entry with two doors, one not in use. Door in use faces Parliament Street, Regal Building and Jeevan Bharti building.
 Gate no. 5: Spiral staircase entry with two doors. One door faces Janpath, N Block and Jeevan Bharti building, the other faces towards Palika Underground Parking.
 Gate no. 6: Staircase entry. Faces N Block and F Block.
 Gate no. 7: Handicap ramp entry. Faces F Block.

See also

References

External links
 Palika Bazaar at Delhi Tourism, Government of Delhi

Bazaars
Bazaars in India
Buildings and structures in Delhi
Neighbourhoods in Delhi
Retail markets in Delhi
Shopping districts and streets in India
Wholesale markets in India
Notorious markets